This is a list of stratigraphic units (groups, formations and members), containing fossils and pertaining to the North American country of Mexico.

List

See also 

 Lists of fossiliferous stratigraphic units in North America

References

External links 
 

 
 
Mexico
Mexico geology-related lists